The Schöllijoch (el. 3343 m.) is a high mountain pass in the Pennine Alps, connecting Gruben/Meiden and St. Niklaus (Mattertal) in the canton of Valais in Switzerland. The path has been recently equipped and is accessible to experienced hikers.

The pass lies between the Barrhorn on the north and the Brunegghorn on the south.

See also
 List of mountain passes in Switzerland

External links 
Description of itinerary

Mountain passes of Valais
Mountain passes of the Alps